The San Francisco Maritime National Historical Park is located in San Francisco, California, United States. The park includes a fleet of historic vessels, a visitor center, a maritime museum, and a library/research facility. The park used to be referred to as the San Francisco Maritime Museum, however the former 1951 name changed in 1978 when the collections were acquired by the National Park Service. Today's San Francisco Maritime National Historical Park was authorized in 1988; the maritime museum is among the park's many cultural resources. The park also incorporates the Aquatic Park Historic District, bounded by Van Ness Avenue, Polk Street, and Hyde Street.

History
Alma de Bretteville Spreckels last major project was the construction of the San Francisco Maritime Museum. When it opened in 1951, her collection of model ships that had been on display at the 1939–40 Golden Gate International Exposition was the main exhibit. However, she had had a feud with museum founding director, Karl Kortum, and as a result, did not receive much recognition for her role in the museum's establishment.

Historic vessel fleet
The historic fleet of the San Francisco Maritime National Historical Park is moored at the park's Hyde Street Pier. The fleet consists of the following major vessels:

Balclutha, an 1886 built square rigged sailing ship.
C.A. Thayer, an 1895 built schooner.
Eureka, an 1890 built steam ferryboat.
Alma, an 1891 built scow schooner.
Hercules, a 1907 built steam tug.
Eppleton Hall, a 1914 built paddlewheel tug.

The fleet also includes over one hundred small craft.

Visitor center
The visitor center is housed in the park's 1909 waterfront warehouse, located at the corner of Hyde and Jefferson streets. The City of San Francisco declared the four-story brick structure a historic landmark in 1974, and the building was listed on the National Register of Historic Places in 1975. Inside, exhibits (including a first order Fresnel lighthouse lens and a shipwrecked boat) tell the story of San Francisco's colorful and diverse maritime heritage. The visitor center also contains a theater and a ranger-staffed information desk.

Maritime Museum

The maritime museum was until recently housed in a Streamline Moderne (late Art Deco) building that is the centerpiece of the Aquatic Park Historic District, a National Historic Landmark at the foot of Polk Street and a minute's walk from the visitor center and Hyde Street Pier. The building was originally built (starting in 1936) by the WPA as a public bathhouse, and its interior is decorated with fantastic and colorful murals, created primarily by artist and color theoretician Hilaire Hiler.  The architects were William Mooser Jr. and William Mooser III.

Maritime Research Center
The Maritime Research Center is the premier resource for San Francisco and Pacific Coast maritime history. Originating in 1939, the collections have become the largest maritime collection on the west coast and the largest museum and research collection in the National Park Service.

The collections include more than:
 35,000 published titles comprising over 74,000 items
 500,000 photographs
 7,000 archival and manuscript collections
 150,000 naval architecture and marine engineering drawings
 3,000 maps and charts
 150,000 feet of motion picture film and video
 6,000 historical archaeology artifacts
 2,500 pieces of folk and fine art
 40,000 history objects
 100 small craft
 50,000 pieces of ephemera
 600 oral histories and audio recordings

Supporting associations
The park is supported by several cooperating associations. One of these is the San Francisco Maritime National Park Association.

Location and access
The visitor center, Hyde Street Pier, and Maritime Museum are all situated adjacent to the foot of Hyde Street and at the western end of the Fisherman's Wharf district. The park headquarters and Maritime Research Center are located in Fort Mason, some 10 minutes walk to the west of the other sites. The Beach and Hyde Street terminal of the San Francisco cable car system adjoins the main site, while the Jones Street terminal of the F Market historic streetcar line is some 5 minutes walk to the east.

Opening times and fees for the various sites can be found on the park's website; see 'External links' below.

Open-water swimming
Aquatic Park is a popular place for open water swimming, both for recreation and training.  The South End Rowing Club and Dolphin Club are located in Aquatic Park. Recently there have been several incidents of swimmers being bitten by sea lions.

See also

49-Mile Scenic Drive
List of maritime museums in the United States
List of museum ships

References

Bibliography
Bill Pickelhaupt, "San Francisco's Aquatic Park," Charleston, SC, 2005,

External links

NPS: official San Francisco Maritime National Historical Park website
NPS: Aquatic Park Historic District
San Francisco Dolphin Club — bay swimming club based at Aquatic Park.

 
Parks in San Francisco
National Historical Parks of the United States
Maritime museums in California
Museums in San Francisco
Open-air museums in California
Fisherman's Wharf, San Francisco
San Francisco Bay
National Register of Historic Places in San Francisco
Ships on the National Register of Historic Places in California
Maritime history of California
Protected areas established in 1978
National Park Service areas in California
Institutions accredited by the American Alliance of Museums
Lincoln Highway
1978 establishments in California
Parks on the National Register of Historic Places in California
Water transportation on the National Register of Historic Places